State Route 206 (SR 206) is a state highway in Douglas County, Nevada, United States. It runs northwest from State Route 88 near the California state line along Foothill Road to Genoa, and then turns east on Genoa Lane to end at U.S. Route 395.

Route description

State Route 206 begins at a junction with SR 88 in Centerville, 1 mile (1.6 km) from the California state line. From there, the route heads northwest with a gradual climb through the Sheridan area to meet SR 207 near Mottsville. The route then continues north, winding along the foothills of the Carson Range until reaching the town of Genoa. From there, SR 206 makes an immediate right at the intersection with Main Street to terminate at US 395 west of Minden–Tahoe Airport.

History

Until the 1976 renumbering, the Genoa Lane section of SR 206 was State Route 57, connecting Genoa to US 395. That route was defined by 1937. However, in the renumbering, SR 206 was assigned to return to US 395 using Jacks Valley Road rather than Genoa Lane. (The part of this from State Route 207 north to State Route 757 had been State Route 19; the rest was unnumbered.) Genoa Lane was assigned State Route 758. By 1995, the piece north of Genoa was removed, and SR 206 was realigned to use SR 758.

Major intersections

See also

References

206
Nevada State Route 206
Transportation in Douglas County, Nevada